Jules Formigé (23 June 1879, Paris – 17 August 1960, Ploubazlanec) was a 20th-century French architect.

Jules was the son of Jean-Camille Formigé.  He was involved in the restoration of the Trophy of Augustus, Arènes de Lutèce, and the Chartreuse du Val-de-Bénédiction at Villeneuve-lès-Avignon. In 1909 he was one of the winners of the Concours de façades de la ville de Paris.

The rue Jules Formigé in Arles is named after him.

External links 
 

20th-century French architects
French archaeologists
1879 births
Artists from Paris
1960 deaths
Members of the Académie des beaux-arts